Fourth Liberty Loans: I Had A Son is a short film from Ken G. Hall made for propaganda purposes in World War Two.

It was part of the Fourth Liberty Loans campaign by the Australian government. The film was criticised in some sectors.

Plot
A father mourns the loss of his fighter pilot son, who crashes in New Guinea during World War II and survives, then sacrifices his life to save other Australian soldiers from a Japanese ambush.

References

External links
I Had a Son at IMDb
I Had a Son at National Film and Sound Archive

Australian World War II propaganda films
1943 films